The 2009–10 Notre Dame Fighting Irish men's basketball team represented the University of Notre Dame in the 2009–2010 NCAA Division I basketball season. The Fighting Irish were coached by Mike Brey and played their home games at the Edmund P. Joyce Center in Notre Dame, IN. The Fighting Irish are members of the Big East Conference. They finished the season 23–12, 10–8 in Big East play. They advanced to the semifinals of the 2010 Big East men's basketball tournament before losing to West Virginia. They received an at–large bid to the 2010 NCAA Division I men's basketball tournament, earning a 6 seed in the South Region. They were upset in the first round by 11 seed Old Dominion.

Roster
Source

2009-10 Schedule and results
Source
All times are Eastern

|-
!colspan=9| Exhibition

|-
!colspan=9| Regular season

|-
!colspan=9| Big East tournament

|-
!colspan=10| 2010 NCAA Division I men's basketball tournament

References

Notre Dame Fighting Irish men's basketball seasons
Notre Dame
Notre Dame
Fight
Fight